Kings and Desperate Men is a 1981 Canadian hostage drama film directed, co-written and produced by Alexis Kanner. The film stars Patrick McGoohan as radio talk show host John Kingsley, Margaret Trudeau as his wife Elizabeth, and Kanner with Andrea Marcovicci as terrorists. The story is set within one day during Christmas Eve. The movie was made on a budget of 1.2 million and was filmed in Montreal. Its title is derived from a line in John Donne's poem  "Death Be Not Proud" (Holy Sonnet X): "Thou art slave to Fate, Chance, kings, and desperate men."

Film director Kanner later took legal action against the film producers of Die Hard in the late 1980s, alleging the producers stole the idea for Die Hard from his film Kings and Desperate Men. Kanner lost his case.

Trudeau was the wife of 15th Canadian Prime Minister Pierre Trudeau, who was in office at the time of both the film's production and its eventual release. She is the mother of 23rd Canadian Prime Minister Justin Trudeau, who assumed office in November 2015.

Plot
On Christmas Eve, a radio talk show host, his wealthy wife, their mentally challenged son and a federal judge are taken hostage by a group of terrorists. The group demand a new trial on the air for a convicted comrade of theirs who the group believes was wrongly convicted of manslaughter. The radio listeners are asked by the terrorists to act as the jury and to telephone in their verdicts to the radio station.

Cast
Patrick McGoohan as John Kingsley
Alexis Kanner as Lucas Miller
Margaret Trudeau as Elizabeth Kingsley
Budd Knapp  as Judge Stephen McManus
Andrea Marcovicci as Barbara
Frank Moore as Pete Herrera
Robin Spry as Harry Gibson
Jean-Pierre Brown as Christopher Kingsley
Kate Nash as Mrs. McPhearson
Neil Vipond as Henry Sutton
Dave Patrick as Grant Gillespie
Kevin Fenlon as Laz
August Schellenberg as Stanley Aldini
Frederic Smith as Bolton
Peter MacNeill as George
Marcel Beaulieu as a member of the Special Squad
Andre Koudsey as a member of the Special Squad
Bob Lepage as a member of the Special Squad
Normand Roy as a member of the Special Squad
Andrew Theodoses as a member of the Special Squad

Release
Kings and Desperate Men was shot on location in Montreal, Canada during December 1977. Film director Kanner apparently spent two years editing the film. The movie was eventually released in Canada on August 22, 1981 at the Montreal World Film Festival. It was released in the USA on November 13, 1983 at the Chicago International Film Festival. It also premiered in the UK at the London Film Festival in 1984. Kings and Desperate Men was rated PG-13 in the United States. The movie was later issued on VHS in 1989.

References

External links
Kings and Desperate Men at the Internet Movie Database
Kings and Desperate Men at Rotten Tomatoes

1981 films
English-language Canadian films
Canadian Christmas films
Films about terrorism
Canadian heist films
Films scored by Pierre F. Brault
Canadian crime drama films
1980s English-language films
1980s Canadian films